Giuseppe Perletto (born 2 May 1948) is an Italian racing cyclist. He won stage 14 of the 1974 Giro d'Italia.

References

External links
 

1948 births
Living people
Italian male cyclists
Italian Giro d'Italia stage winners
Place of birth missing (living people)
Sportspeople from the Province of Imperia
Cyclists from Liguria